The 16th Seiyu Awards was held on March 5, 2022, at the JOQR Media Plus Hall in Minato, Tokyo. The winners of the Merit Awards, the Kei Tomiyama Award, the Kazue Takahashi Award, and the Synergy Award were announced on February 15, 2022. The rest of the winners were announced on the ceremony day.

References

Seiyu Awards ceremonies
Seiyu
Seiyu
March 2022 events in Japan
2021 in Japanese cinema
Seiyu